Andriessen is a Dutch patronymic surname meaning son of Andries cognate to the surnames Andrews and Anderson.  People named Andriessen or Andriesse  include:

Andriessen
 Adrie Andriessen (1960–2021), Dutch footballer
 Anthonie Andriessen (1746–1813), Dutch painter
 Christiaan Andriessen (1775–1846), Dutch draftsman, son of Jurriaan Andriessen (artist)
 Frans Andriessen (1929–2019), Dutch politician
 Hendrick Andriessen (1607–1655), Flemish painter
 Hendrik Andriessen  (1892–1981), Dutch composer, brother of Willem and Mari
 Jurriaan Andriessen (artist) (1742–1819), Dutch decorative painter
 Jurriaan Andriessen (composer) (1925–1996), Dutch composer, son  of Hendrik Andriessen
 Koos Andriessen (1928–2019), Dutch politician
 Louis Andriessen (1939–2021), Dutch composer, son of Hendrik Andriessen
 Mari Andriessen (1897–1977), Dutch sculptor, brother of Willem and Hendrik
 Willem Andriessen (1887–1964), Dutch pianist and composer, brother of Hendrik and Mari

Purely patronymic
 Albert Andriessen Bradt (1607–1687), Norwegian-born settler from Amsterdam in New Amsterdam

Andriesse
 Cornelis Dirk Andriesse (born 1939), Dutch physicist
 Emmy Andriesse (1914–1953), Dutch photographer

See also 
 Andreessen (disambiguation)
 Andreassen
 Andreasson
 Andresen
 Andersen
 Anderiesen

References 

Dutch-language surnames
Patronymic surnames
Surnames from given names